Millia Institute of Technology is very first engineering college in the Seemanchal Region established in 2002 by Millia Educational Trust (MET). It is affiliated to Purnea University, approved by AICTE, Delhi. The founder principal of this college was late Prof S.C Roy (Ex HOD MIT Muzaffarpur). Initially this college started with a small library, a main building and four core branches Mechanical, Electrical, Electronics & Communication and Computer Science. Civil Engineering was added in 2007.

There is also a polytechnic college running under Millia Educational Trust.

Administration 
The administration of the college is run by a team of MET, whose head is the Director of MET.

Academics 
MIT offers five engineering courses in the following discipline :

Computer Science and Engineering 
Mechanical Engineering 
Civil Engineering 
Electrical Engineering 
Electronics Engineering 

2002 establishments in Bihar
Educational institutions established in 2002
Colleges affiliated to Purnea University